The football tournament at the 1976 Summer Olympics started on 18 July and ended on 31 July. Only one event, the men's tournament, was contested. 13 teams participated in the tournament, while three African teams took part in the boycott.

Venues

Qualification 

The following 13 teams qualified for the 1976 Olympics football tournament:

Africa (CAF)
 (withdrew)
 (withdrew)
 (withdrew)
Asia (AFC)

North and Central America (CONCACAF)
 (replaced )

South America (CONMEBOL)

 (withdrew)
Europe (UEFA)

 (automatically qualified as 1972 Olympic Champions)

Hosting nation

Match officials 

Asia
  Abraham Klein
  Jafar Namdar
North and Central America
  Peter Thomas Johnson
  Werner Winsemann
  Marco Antonio Dorantes
South America
  Ángel Coerezza
  Arnaldo Cézar Coelho
  Guillermo Velásquez
  Ramón Barreto

Europe
  Paul Schiller
  Robert Helies
  Alberto Michelotti
  Adolf Prokop
  Károly Palotai
  Marian Kuston
  John Paterson
  Emilio Guruceta-Muro
  Vladimir Rudnev

Squads

Final tournament

First round

Group A

Group B

Group C

Group D 

 **Zambia withdrew

Bracket

Quarter-finals

Semi-finals

Bronze Medal match

Gold Medal match

Medal winners 

 –  Gold

Hans-Ulrich Grapenthin
Wilfried Gröbner
Jürgen Croy
Gerd Weber
Hans-Jürgen Dörner
Konrad Weise
Lothar Kurbjuweit
Reinhard Lauck
Gert Heidler
Reinhard Häfner
Hans-Jürgen Riediger
Bernd Bransch
Martin Hoffmann
Gerd Kische
Wolfram Löwe
Hartmut Schade
Dieter Riedel

Coach: Georg Buschner

 –  Silver

Jan Tomaszewski
Piotr Mowlik
Antoni Szymanowski
Jerzy Gorgoń
Wojciech Rudy
Władysław Żmuda
Zygmunt Maszczyk
Grzegorz Lato
Henryk Wawrowski
Henryk Kasperczak
Roman Ogaza
Kazimierz Kmiecik
Kazimierz Deyna
Andrzej Szarmach
Henryk Wieczorek
Leslaw Cmikiewicz
Jan Benigier

Coach: Kazimierz Górski

 –  Bronze

Vladimir Astapovsky
Anatoliy Konkov
Viktor Matviyenko
Mykhaylo Fomenko
Stefan Reshko
Volodymyr Troshkin
David Kipiani
Volodymyr Onyshchenko
Viktor Kolotov
Volodymyr Veremeyev
Oleh Blokhin
Leonid Buryak
Vladimir Fyodorov
Aleksandr Minayev
Viktor Zvyahintsev
Leonid Nazarenko
Aleksandr Prokhorov

Coach: Valeriy Lobanovskyi

Goalscorers 

With six goals, Andrzej Szarmach of Poland is the top scorer in the tournament. In total, 66 goals were scored by 44 different players, with only one of them credited as own goal.

6 goals
 Andrzej Szarmach
4 goals
 Hans-Jürgen Dörner
3 goals
 Michel Platini
 Víctor Rangel
 Grzegorz Lato
 Volodymyr Onyshchenko
2 goals

 Jarbas
 Jimmy Douglas
 Jean-Marc Schaer
 Loïc Amisse
 Vicky Peretz
 Hong Song-Nam
 Viktor Kolotov

1 goal

 Chico Fraga
 Erivelto
 Júnior
 Rosemiro
 Hans-Jürgen Riediger
 Hartmut Schade
 Lothar Kurbjuweit
 Martin Hoffmann
 Reinhard Häfner
 Wolfram Löwe
 Bruno Baronchelli
 Francisco Rubio
 Marco Fion
 Ali Parvin
 Gholam Hossein Mazloumi
 Hassan Rowshan
 Parviz Ghelichkhani
 Itzhak Shum
 Yaron Oz
 Hugo Sánchez
 An Se-Uk
 Antoni Szymanowski
 Kazimierz Deyna
 Aleksandr Minayev
 Leonid Nazarenko
 Oleh Blokhin
 Viktor Zvyahintsev
 Volodymyr Veremeyev
 Santiago Idígoras

Own goal
 Eduardo Rergis (playing against Guatemala)

Final ranking

References

External links 

Olympic Football Tournament Montreal 1976, FIFA.com
RSSSF Summary

 
1976 Summer Olympics events
1976
1976 in association football
1976
Soccer in Ontario
Soccer in Quebec
Open
International sports competitions in Toronto